Laufeia is a spider genus of the jumping spider family, Salticidae, with a mainly Asian distribution, where they are found on tree trunks and branches or among leaf litter.

Description
Laufeia species are mostly small, hairy, brownish spiders. The chelicera usually has a tooth with two cusps on the rear-facing edge. The male generally has a slightly hardened plate (scutum) on the upper surface of the abdomen. The genitalia vary considerably between species; for example, the male palpal bulb has either a long or short embolus, which may or may not be coiled.

Taxonomy
The genus Laufeia was erected by Eugène Simon in 1889 for the type species Laufeia aenea, which had been collected in Yokohama, Japan. Simon did not explain the origin of the genus name. In Norse mythology, Laufeia was the mother of the god Loki.

Four more Laufeia species were known to Andrzej Bohdanowicz and Jerzy Prószyński in 1987; they doubted that three of them belonged in the genus. In 2012, Prószyński and  Christa Deeleman-Reinhold split off some Laufeia species into the genera Orcevia and Junxattus, noting the diversity of genital structures. A molecular and morphological study in 2015 showed that the original circumscription of Laufeia constituted a strongly supported clade, and Junxia Zhang and Wayne Maddison restored all the species to Laufeia, arguing that strong sexual selection could produce genital diversity even in closely related species.

Species
, the World Spider Catalog accepted the following species:

Laufeia aenea Simon, 1889 (type species) – China, Korea, Japan
Laufeia aerihirta (Urquhart, 1888) – New Zealand
Laufeia concava Zhang & Maddison, 2012 – Malaysia
Laufeia daiqini (Prószyński & Deeleman-Reinhold, 2012) – Sumatra
Laufeia eucola (Thorell, 1890) – Sumatra
Laufeia eximia Zhang & Maddison, 2012 – China
Laufeia keyserlingi (Thorell, 1890) – Sumatra, Java
Laufeia kuloni (Prószyński & Deeleman-Reinhold, 2012) – Java
Laufeia longapophysis Lei & Peng, 2012 – China
Laufeia perakensis (Simon, 1901) – Malaysia, Java
Laufeia proszynskii Song, Gu & Chen, 1988 – China
Laufeia sasakii Ikeda, 1998 – Japan
Laufeia sicus Wu & Yang, 2008 – China
Laufeia squamata (Zabka, 1985) – China, Vietnam

References

External links
 Diagnostic drawings of Laufeia species
 Photograph of a Laufeia species

Salticidae
Salticidae genera
Spiders of Asia
Spiders of Oceania